Chilling, Thrilling Sounds of the Haunted House is an LP album intended for "older children, teenagers, and adults", released by Disneyland Records (now known as Walt Disney Records). The album was mainly composed of sound effects that had been collected by the sound effects department of Walt Disney Studios. The album was released in several different forms. The album was first released in 1964 in a white sleeve, with a second release in 1973 with an orange sleeve. In both versions, the first side contained 10 stories narrated by Laura Olsher, complete with sound effects. The second side contained 10 sound effects meant for others to create their own stories.

Despite the title, most of the cuts had nothing to do with haunted houses or witches or ghostly spirits. Featured were such situations as an ocean liner hitting rocks, an idiotic lumberjack, a man crossing an unsafe bridge, someone lighting a stick of dynamite and a spaceship landing on Mars. Also, there are tracks with several examples of cats, dogs and birds (similar to The Birds) becoming enraged for some reason, as well as a skit about Chinese water torture.

History
There was also a British release in 1974 which contained a completely redesigned cover. In 1979, Disney released a follow-up album called New Chilling, Thrilling Sounds of the Haunted House with 33 tracks; however, it featured no haunted mansion specific content, and with many completely different effects (mainly from other sources, including some heard on the Looney Tunes cartoons). Edited portions of this later album were included on a CD called Halloween Songs & Sounds.

On December 7, 1972, the album became a certified gold record by the RIAA. On April 11, 1988, the 1979 follow-up edition of the album was certified gold by the RIAA.

Art
The covers of the American albums featured an image painted with acrylics by Paul Wenzel, which he created as concept art for the attraction The Haunted Mansion. The original was 37" x 39" and was purchased at auction in 2001 for US$3,000. The cover of the British release featured an actual photo of the ride, while the 1979 album simply displayed a colored image of a haunted house, ravens and a skeleton in a coffin.

Samples and cover versions
Some of the stories on the album are better known for being sampled in rap songs such as N.W.A's "Quiet on Tha Set," Ice Cube's "Look Who's Burnin'" and "Jackin' for Beats", and Jedi Mind Tricks' "Chinese Water Torture". In 1997, Xero, precursor to the rock band Linkin Park, sampled "The Very Long Fuse" on their demo tape.

On October 31, 2014, the American rock band Phish performed side one of Chilling, Thrilling Sounds of the Haunted House with original instrumental music to accompany the album as their "musical costume" for the second set of their Halloween night show at the MGM Grand in Las Vegas, Nevada. Following that performance, the band has made their interpretation of "Martian Monster" a regular part of their concert repertoire and have performed it at over 35 subsequent concerts.

Track listing: 1964 version

Track listing: 1979 version

References

1964 albums
Disneyland Records albums
Novelty albums
Sound effects albums